Angela (Lina) Barbaro-Galtieri (born 1934) is a retired Italian and American particle physicist. Working at the Lawrence Berkeley National Laboratory, she assisted Luis Walter Alvarez in his Nobel Prize winning research using a bubble chamber to discover new particles, and she later participated in the discovery of the top quark.

Education and career
Galtieri was born on October 23, 1934 in Palmi, Calabria. She studied in the Marconi Institute of Physics at Sapienza University of Rome, completing her doctorate there in 1957.

After working as an assistant at Sapienza University, she moved to the Lawrence Berkeley National Laboratory in 1961. She co-directed the Particle Data Group from 1963 to 1974. In 1994, she became head of the lab's CDF Project, associated with the Collider Detector at Fermilab. She retired in 2005.

Recognition
In 1984, Galtieri was elected as a Fellow of the American Physical Society (APS), after a nomination from the APS Division of Particles and Fields, "for contributions to the discovery and measurements of properties of both light and heavy quark resonances."

Personal life
Galtieri competed in track and field in high school. After retiring, Galtieri became active in mountaineering and long-distance running, including climbs of Mount Kilimanjaro and Toubkal, trips to the base camps of Mount Everest and K2, a hike circling Mont Blanc, and several runs in the Bay to Breakers footrace.

References

External links
Home page

1934 births
Living people
People from Palmi
American physicists
American women physicists
Italian physicists
Italian women physicists
Sapienza University of Rome alumni
Lawrence Berkeley National Laboratory people
Fellows of the American Physical Society